Jørgen D. Heidemann (born March 27, 1946) is a former Danish handball player who competed in the 1972 Summer Olympics.

He played his club handball with Fredericia KFUM, and was the top goalscorer of the club in the 1969 Danish Handball League season. In 1972 he was part of the Denmark men's national handball team which finished thirteenth in the Olympic tournament. He played all five matches and scored eight goals.

External links
Sports-Reference profile
Topscorere siden 1946 - Herrer at Danish Handball Federation

1946 births
Living people
Danish male handball players
Olympic handball players of Denmark
Handball players at the 1972 Summer Olympics